The Lotus Flower Tower is a peak in the Cirque of the Unclimbables, Northwest Territories, Canada. It is located on the ridge one km southwest of Mount Sir James MacBrien, and though it is not prominent in relation to surrounding peaks, it is noted for its sheer rock walls which are home to classic alpine rock climbs.

The first ascent was made by William J. Buckingham and party on July 16, 1960, via a traverse from "Tathagata Tower" along the ridge which connects Lotus Flower Tower to Mount Sir James MacBrien. The peak's second ascent and first ascent of the sheer 2200 foot southeast face was made in 1968 by Harthon "Sandy" Bill, Tom Frost, and James McCarthy.

The first free ascent of the McCarthy-Frost-Bill route was completed by Steve Levin, Mark Robinson and Sandy Stewart in 1977.

The striking route was recognized as one of the Fifty Classic Climbs of North America and has been called "one of the most aesthetically beautiful rock faces in the world".

References

External links
 
 

Two-thousanders of the Northwest Territories
Nahanni National Park Reserve
Climbing routes